This article summarizes the events related to the world of poker in 1980.

Major tournaments

1980 World Series of Poker 

Stu Ungar wins the main tournament.

1980 Super Bowl of Poker 

Gabe Kaplan wins the main tournament.

Poker Hall of Fame 

Blondie Forbes is inducted.

See also 
 Chronology of poker

References 

1980 in poker